Mun maailma is the third studio album by Finnish rapper Mikael Gabriel. It was released on 10 May 2013. The album peaked at number 20 on the Official Finnish Album Chart.

Track listing

Charts

Release history

References

2013 albums
Mikael Gabriel albums